Maria Elisabetta Carlotta of Savoy (16 July 1752 – 17 April 1753) was a princess of Savoy by birth, and daughter of King Victor Amadeus III of Savoy and his wife, Maria Antonia Ferdinanda of Spain.

Biography
Born to the Duke and Duchess of Savoy at the Royal Palace of Turin, she was the couple's eldest daughter. Her sisters included the future "grand daughters-in-law" of Louis XV of France: Princess Maria Giuseppina and Princess Maria Teresa.

Her brothers included the last three kings of Sardinia from the mainline; the future Charles Emmanuel IV, Victor Emmanuel I and Charles Felix of Sardinia.

Death 
Maria Elisabetta died on 17 April 1753, in Turin, aged only 9 months. She was buried in the Basilica of Superga, traditional burial site of members of the House of Savoy.

Ancestry

References 

1752 births
1753 deaths
18th-century Italian people
Burials at the Basilica of Superga
Nobility from Turin
Princesses of Savoy
Royalty and nobility who died as children
Daughters of kings